Danio quangbinhensis (Vietnamese: cá phong nha) is a species of cyprinid found only in Phong Nha-Kẻ Bàng National Park, Quảng Bình Province, North Central Coast, Vietnam. It is sometimes found in the ornamental fish trade.

Characteristics

Adult males reach lengths of 8.5 cm.

References

Danio
Endemic fauna of Vietnam
Fish of Vietnam
Cyprinid fish of Asia
Fish described in 1999